In combinatorics, Ramsey's theorem, in one of its graph-theoretic forms, states that one will find monochromatic cliques in any edge labelling (with colours) of a sufficiently large complete graph. To demonstrate the theorem for two colours (say, blue and red), let  and  be any two positive integers. Ramsey's theorem states that there exists a least positive integer  for which every blue-red edge colouring of the complete graph on  vertices contains a blue clique on  vertices or a red clique on  vertices.

Ramsey's theorem is a foundational result in combinatorics. The first version of this result was proved by F. P. Ramsey. This initiated the combinatorial theory now called Ramsey theory, that seeks regularity amid disorder: general conditions for the existence of substructures with regular properties. In this application it is a question of the existence of monochromatic subsets, that is, subsets of connected edges of just one colour.

An extension of this theorem applies to any finite number of colours, rather than just two.

Examples

R(3, 3) = 6

Suppose the edges of a complete graph on 6 vertices are coloured red and blue. Pick a vertex, . (If not, exchange red and blue in what follows.) If any of the edges, are also blue then we have an entirely blue triangle. If not, then those three edges are all red and we have an entirely red triangle. Since this argument works for any colouring, any  contains a monochromatic , and therefore . The popular version of this is called the theorem on friends and strangers.

An alternative proof works by double counting. It goes as follows: Count the number of ordered triples of vertices, such that the edge, is red and the edge, is blue. Therefore, there are at most  such triples. Secondly, for any non-monochromatic triangle , there exist precisely two such triples. Therefore, there are at most 18 non-monochromatic triangles.

Conversely, it is possible to 2-colour a  without creating any monochromatic , showing that . The unique colouring is shown to the right. Thus .

The task of proving that  was one of the problems of William Lowell Putnam Mathematical Competition in 1953, as well as in the Hungarian Math Olympiad in 1947.

A multicolour example: R(3, 3, 3) = 17 

A multicolour Ramsey number is a Ramsey number using 3 or more colours.

Suppose that we have an edge colouring of a complete graph using 3 colours, red, green and blue. Suppose further that the edge colouring has no monochromatic triangles. Select a vertex . Consider the set of vertices that have a red edge to the vertex . The red neighbourhood of  cannot contain any red edges, since otherwise there would be a red triangle consisting of the two endpoints of that red edge and the vertex . Thus, the induced edge colouring on the red neighbourhood of  has edges coloured with only two colours, namely green and blue. Since , the red neighbourhood of  can contain at most 5 vertices. Similarly, the green and blue neighbourhoods of  can contain at most 5 vertices each. Thus, we have .

To see that , it suffices to draw an edge colouring on the complete graph on 16 vertices with 3 colours that avoids monochromatic triangles. Both colourings are shown in the figures to the right, with the untwisted colouring on the left, and the twisted colouring on the right.

It is also known that there are exactly 115 edge colourings with 3 colours on  that avoid monochromatic triangles, provided that we consider edge colourings that differ by a permutation of the colours as being the same.

Proof

2-colour case
It is clear from the definition that for all , . This starts the induction. We prove that  exists by finding an explicit bound for it. By the inductive hypothesis  and  exist.

Lemma 1. 

Proof. Consider a complete graph on  vertices whose edges are coloured with two colours. Because the graph has  vertices, it follows that either  or  In the former case, if  has a red  then so does the original graph and we are finished. The latter case is analogous. Thus the claim is true and we have completed the proof for 2 colours.

Proof. Let  and consider a two-coloured graph of  vertices. If  is degree of -th vertex in the blue subgraph, then, according to the Handshaking lemma,  is even. Given that  is odd, there must be an even . According to the Pigeonhole principle, either  or  Since  is even, while  is odd, the first inequality can be strengthened, so either  or   Suppose  Then either the  subgraph has a red  and the proof is complete, or it has a blue  which along with vertex 1 makes a blue . The case  is treated similarly.

Case of more colours
Lemma 2. If , then 

Proof. Consider a complete graph of  vertices and colour its edges with  colours. Thus the graph is now -coloured. In the former case we are finished. In the latter case, we recover our sight again and see from the definition of  we must have either a -monochrome  or a -monochrome . In either case the proof is complete.

Lemma 1 implies that any  is finite. The right hand side of the inequality in Lemma 2 expresses a Ramsey number for   colours  in terms of Ramsey numbers for fewer colours. Therefore any  is finite for any number of colours. This proves the theorem.

Ramsey numbers

The numbers  in Ramsey's theorem (and their extensions to more than two colours) are known as Ramsey numbers. The Ramsey number, gives the solution to the party problem, which asks the minimum number of guests, that must be invited so that at least  will know each other or at least  will not know each other. In the language of graph theory, the Ramsey number is the minimum number of vertices, such that all undirected simple graphs of order , contain a clique of order , or an independent set of order .

By symmetry, it is true that . An upper bound for  can be extracted from the proof of the theorem, and other arguments give lower bounds. (The first exponential lower bound was obtained by Paul Erdős using the probabilistic method.) However, there is a vast gap between the tightest lower bounds and the tightest upper bounds.

Computing a lower bound  for  usually requires exhibiting a blue/red colouring of the graph  with no blue  subgraph and no red  subgraph. Such a counterexample is called a Ramsey graph. Brendan McKay maintains a list of known Ramsey graphs. Upper bounds are often considerably more difficult to establish: one either has to check all possible colourings to confirm the absence of a counterexample, or to present a mathematical argument for its absence.

Computational complexity 

A sophisticated computer program does not need to look at all colourings individually in order to eliminate all of them; nevertheless it is a very difficult computational task that existing software can only manage on small sizes. Each complete graph  has  edges, so there would be a total of  graphs to search through (for  colours) if brute force is used.

The situation is unlikely to improve with the advent of quantum computers.  The best known algorithm exhibits only a quadratic speedup (c.f. Grover's algorithm) relative to classical computers, so that the computation time is still exponential in the number of nodes.

Known values 
As described above, . It is easy to prove that , and, more generally, that  for all : a graph on  nodes with all edges coloured red serves as a counterexample and proves that ; among colourings of a graph on  nodes, the colouring with all edges coloured red contains a -node red subgraph, and all other colourings contain a 2-node blue subgraph (that is, a pair of nodes connected with a blue edge.)

Using induction inequalities, it can be concluded that , and therefore . There are only two  graphs (that is, 2-colourings of a complete graph on 16 nodes without 4-node red or blue complete subgraphs) among  different 2-colourings of 16-node graphs, and only one  graph (the Paley graph of order 17) among  colourings. (This was proven by Evans, Pulham and Sheehan in 1979.) It follows that .

The fact that  was first established by Brendan McKay and Stanisław Radziszowski in 1995.

In 1997, McKay, Radziszowski and Exoo employed computer-assisted graph generation methods to conjecture that . They were able to construct exactly 656  graphs, arriving at the same set of graphs through different routes. None of the 656 graphs can be extended to a  graph.

The standard survey on the development of Ramsey number research is the Dynamic Survey 1 of the Electronic Journal of Combinatorics, by Stanisław Radziszowski, which is periodically updated.   Where not cited otherwise, entries in the table below are taken from the January 2021 edition.  (Note there is a trivial symmetry across the diagonal since .)

Asymptotics 
The inequality  may be applied inductively to prove that

In particular, this result, due to Erdős and Szekeres, implies that when ,

An exponential lower bound,

was given by Erdős in 1947 and was instrumental in his introduction of the probabilistic method. There is no known explicit construction producing an exponential lower bound. The best known lower and upper bounds for diagonal Ramsey numbers currently stand at

due to Spencer and Conlon respectively. Marcelo Campos, Simon Griffiths, Robert Morris and Julian Sahasrabudhe improved the upper bound to

where  (preprint as of mid-March 2023). The authors wrote that this result "could be improved further with some additional (straightforward, but somewhat technical) optimisation."

For the off-diagonal Ramsey numbers , it is known that they are of order ; this may be stated equivalently as saying that the smallest possible independence number in an -vertex triangle-free graph is

More generally, for off-diagonal Ramsey numbers, with  fixed and  growing, the best known bounds are

due to Bohman and Keevash and Ajtai, Komlós and Szemerédi respectively.

Induced Ramsey
There is a less well-known yet interesting analogue of Ramsey's theorem for induced subgraphs. Roughly speaking, instead of finding a monochromatic subgraph, we are now required to find a monochromatic induced subgraph. In this variant, it is no longer sufficient to restrict our focus to complete graphs, since the existence of a complete subgraph does not imply the existence of an induced subgraph. The qualitative statement of the theorem in the next section was first proven independently by Erdős, Hajnal and Pósa, Deuber and Rödl in the 1970s. Since then, there has been much research in obtaining good bounds for induced Ramsey numbers.

Statement
Let  be a graph on  vertices.

Sometimes, we also consider the asymmetric version of the problem.

History and Bounds

Similar to Ramsey's Theorem, it is unclear a priori whether induced Ramsey numbers exist for every graph . In the early 1970s, Erdős, Hajnal and Pósa, Deuber and Rödl independently proved that this is the case. However, the original proofs gave terrible bounds (e.g. towers of twos) on the induced Ramsey numbers. It is interesting to ask if better bounds can be achieved. In 1974, Paul Erdős conjectured that there exists a constant  such that every graph  on  vertices satisfies . If this conjecture is true, it would be optimal up to the constant  because the complete graph achieves a lower bound of this form (in fact, it's the same as Ramsey numbers). However, this conjecture is still open as of now.

In 1984, Erdős and Hajnal claimed that they proved the bound

However, that was still far from the exponential bound conjectured by Erdős. Their approach was to consider a suitable random graph constructed on projective planes and show that it has the desired properties with nonzero probability. The idea of using random graphs on projective planes have also previously been used in studying Ramsey properties with respect to vertex colorings and the induced Ramsey problem on bounded degree graphs .

Kohayakawa, Prömel and Rödl's bound remained the best general bound for a decade. In 2008, Fox and Sudakov provided an explicit construction for induced Ramsey numbers with the same bound. In particular, for some constant , the Paley graph on  vertices is such that all of its edge colorings in two colors contain an induced monochromatic copy of every -vertex graph.

Similar to the previous work in 2008, they showed that every -graph  with small  and edge density  contains an induced monochromatic copy of every graph on  vertices in any edge coloring in two colors. Currently, Erdős's conjecture that  remains open and is one of the important problems in extremal graph theory.

For lower bounds, not much is known in general except for the fact that induced Ramsey numbers must be at least the corresponding Ramsey numbers. Some lower bounds have been obtained for some special cases (see Special Cases).

Special Cases
While the general bounds for the induced Ramsey numbers are exponential in the size of the graph, the behaviour is much different on special classes of graphs (in particular, sparse ones). Many of these classes have induced Ramsey numbers polynomial in the number of vertices.

If  is a tree on  vertices, it is known that . It is also known that  is superlinear (i.e.  ). Note that this is in contrast to the usual Ramsey numbers, where the Burr–Erdős conjecture (now proven) tells us that  is linear (since trees are 1-degenerate).

This result was first proven by Łuczak and Rödl in 1996, with  growing as a tower of twos with height . In 2013, Conlon, Fox and Zhao showed using a counting lemma for sparse pseudorandom graphs that , where the exponent is best possible up to constant factors.

Generalizations
Similar to Ramsey numbers, we can generalize the notion of induced Ramsey numbers to hypergraphs and multicolor settings.

More colors
We can also generalize the induced Ramsey's theorem to a multicolor setting. Let  ( copies of ).

Hypergraphs
We can extend the definition of induced Ramsey numbers to -uniform hypergraphs by simply changing the word graph in the statement to hypergraph. Furthermore, we can define the multicolor version of induced Ramsey numbers in the same way as the previous subsection.

Let  be a -uniform hypergraph with  vertices. In particular, this result mirrors the best known bound for the usual Ramsey number when .

Extensions of the theorem

Infinite graphs
A further result, also commonly called Ramsey's theorem, applies to infinite graphs. In a context where finite graphs are also being discussed it is often called the "Infinite Ramsey theorem". As intuition provided by the pictorial representation of a graph is diminished when moving from finite to infinite graphs, theorems in this area are usually phrased in set-theoretic terminology.

Theorem. Then there exists some infinite subset  of  such that the size  subsets of  all have the same colour.

For , the statement is equivalent to saying that if you split an infinite set into a finite number of sets, then one of them is infinite. This is evident. Further, there are infinitely many values of  such that this colour will be the same. Take these 's to get the desired monochromatic set.

A stronger but unbalanced infinite form of Ramsey's theorem for graphs, the Erdős–Dushnik–Miller theorem, states that every infinite graph contains either a countably infinite independent set, or an infinite clique of the same cardinality as the original graph.

Infinite version implies the finite
It is possible to deduce the finite Ramsey theorem from the infinite version by a proof by contradiction. Suppose the finite Ramsey theorem is false. Let  denote the -colourings of  without a monochromatic set of size .

Continuing so, define  for all integers , .

Now, for any integer , 
 
and each set is non-empty. Furthermore,  is finite as 

It follows that the intersection of all of these sets is non-empty, and let 

This contradicts the infinite Ramsey theorem.

If a suitable topological viewpoint is taken, this argument becomes a standard compactness argument showing that the infinite version of the theorem implies the finite version.

Hypergraphs 
The theorem can also be extended to hypergraphs. An -hypergraph is a graph whose "edges" are sets of  vertices – in a normal graph an edge is a set of 2 vertices.

For  we know the exact value of one non-trivial Ramsey number, namely . This fact was established by Brendan McKay and Stanisław Radziszowski in 1991.

Directed graphs 
Let  be the smallest number  such that any complete graph with singly directed arcs (also called a "tournament") and with  nodes contains an acyclic (also called "transitive") -node subtournament.

This is the directed-graph analogue of what (above) has been called , the smallest number  such that any 2-colouring of the edges of a complete undirected graph with  nodes, contains a monochromatic complete graph on n nodes. (The directed analogue of the two possible arc colours is the two directions of the arcs, the analogue of "monochromatic" is "all arc-arrows point the same way"; i.e., "acyclic.")

Ramsey Cardinals 

A Ramsey cardinal, is a large cardinal axiomatically defined to satisfy the related formula: .

Relationship to the axiom of choice
In reverse mathematics, there is a significant difference in proof strength between the version of Ramsey's theorem for infinite graphs (the case n = 2) and for infinite multigraphs (the case n ≥ 3). The multigraph version of the theorem is equivalent in strength to the arithmetical comprehension axiom, making it part of the subsystem ACA0 of second-order arithmetic, one of the big five subsystems in reverse mathematics. In contrast, by a theorem of David Seetapun, the graph version of the theorem is weaker than ACA0, and (combining Seetapun's result with others) it does not fall into one of the big five subsystems.  Over ZF, however, the graph version is equivalent to the classical Kőnig's lemma.

See also
Ramsey cardinal
Paris–Harrington theorem
Sim (pencil game)
Infinite Ramsey theory
Van der Waerden number
Ramsey game
Erdős–Rado theorem

Notes

References
.

.
.

.
.
.

.
.
.

External links

 
 Ramsey@Home is a distributed computing project designed to find new lower bounds for various Ramsey numbers using a host of different techniques.
 The Electronic Journal of Combinatorics dynamic survey of small Ramsey numbers (by Stanisław Radziszowski)
 Ramsey Number – from MathWorld (contains lower and upper bounds up to R(19, 19))
 Ramsey Number – Geoffrey Exoo (Contains R(5, 5) > 42 counter-proof)

Ramsey theory
Theorems in graph theory
Articles containing proofs